Praociini is a tribe of darkling beetles in the subfamily Pimeliinae of the family Tenebrionidae. There are about 15 genera in Praociini, found in the Neotropics.

Genera
These genera belong to the tribe Praociini

 Antofagapraocis Flores, 2000
 Asidelia Fairmaire, 1905
 Calymmophorus Solier, 1841
 Eutelocera Solier, 1841
 Falsopraocis Kulzer, 1958
 Gyrasida Koch, 1962
 Neopraocis Kulzer, 1958
 Parapraocis Flores & Giraldo, 2020
 Patagonopraocis Flores & Chani-Posse, 2005
 Pilobaloderes Kulzer, 1958
 Platesthes G.R. Waterhouse, 1845
 Platyholmus Dejean, 1834
 Praocidia Fairmaire, 1904
 Praocis Eschscholtz, 1829
 Thylacoderes Solier, 1843

References

Further reading

 
 

Tenebrionoidea